So Sick may refer to:

"So Sick", a 2006 song by Ne-Yo
"So Sick", a song by Michael Kiske from his 1996 album	Instant Clarity

"So Sick", 2020 song by Blackbear featuring Kiiara from the album Lil Kiiwi